Muselliferidae is a family of worms belonging to the order Chaetonotida.

Genera:
 Diuronotus Todaro, Balsamo & Kristensen, 2005
 Musellifer Hummon, 1969

References

Gastrotricha